Rhyl and District Rugby Football Club (Welsh: Clwb Rygbi y Rhyl A'r Cylch) is a rugby union club in Rhyl, North Wales. Rhyl and District RFC is a member of the Welsh Rugby Union and is a feeder club for the Llanelli Scarlets.

The club fields Senior and Second men's teams, a women's team; as well as a full range of mini and junior squads (from under 7 to under 16), a Youth team and the "Mini Dragons" from age 5+.

References

Welsh rugby union teams
Rhyl